Antillonerius is a genus of flies in the family Neriidae.

Species
Antillonerius bistriatus (Williston, 1896)
Antillonerius cinereus (Röder, 1885)

References

Brachycera genera
Taxa named by Willi Hennig
Neriidae
Diptera of North America